The Den (released in some countries as Hacked) is a 2013 American slasher film by Zachary Donohue and his feature film directorial debut. The film is shot in screenlife and found footage style and was first released in Russia as смерть в сети, Death Online on December 23, 2013. It was given a simultaneous limited theatrical and VOD release on March 14, 2014 through IFC Midnight. It stars Melanie Papalia as a young woman who discovers a murder via webcam. 

The film explores the themes of social media, computer hacking, voyeurism, the deep web, filmed deaths in the style of a snuff film, and kidnapping.

Plot

The film begins with Elizabeth logging into a webcam-based social media site known as The Den, which allows users to chat with random strangers across the world, similar to Chatroulette. For her graduate project in sociology, she proposes to chat with as many strangers as possible and calculate how many meaningful conversations she can accumulate. The graduate board reluctantly gives her a grant, with the help of Sally, one of her friends on the graduate board. Sally pushes for her approval. Elizabeth spends the next few months continuously chatting with strangers, much to the chagrin of her boyfriend, Damien, and friends Jenni and Max. Though most of her chats are quickly ended due to sexual content or scams, she accumulates plenty of data and is optimistic about the outcome of the project.

While in the company of Jenni and chatting with strangers, Elizabeth encounters a woman whose webcam appears to be broken. The stranger reacts aggressively to Jenni when Elizabeth is away from the webcam, and Jenni logs off. Afterwards, Elizabeth's account is hacked, and her webcam is repeatedly turned on without her permission. The stranger attempts to chat with Elizabeth again the next day while she is in a coffee shop, but logs off quickly when another customer approaches the webcam. That night, Damien surprises Elizabeth by showing up to her home in the middle of the night. Elizabeth's hacked webcam records the couple having sex, before the hacker sends the video to Elizabeth's graduate board.

Later, Elizabeth is prompted to chat with the stranger again; the stranger reveals that they witnessed Elizabeth having sex. Later still, their webcam turns on and reveals the account holder bound and gagged. She is murdered on-screen by a masked man. Elizabeth is shaken and immediately takes the video of the murder to the police. The police acknowledge that the video appears genuine, but advise her that such snuff films are usually faked. They also report that there is little they can do about it. Elizabeth later stumbles upon a disturbingly realistic depiction of a death during a game of Russian roulette, which turns out to be faked. Her friends, including the computer scientist Max, insist that the video is a hoax. Elizabeth remains unconvinced and is determined to solve the murder. However, both the police and other users of The Den turn out to be unhelpful. When she enlists Max to hack the account and to see where it originated, he finds that it has been routed through countless proxies. This makes the video untraceable.

Damien is abducted while chatting with Elizabeth. She has her back turned at the moment of his kidnapping, and does not realize that he is missing until later. She eventually receives a bizarre call from his computer, which depicts his house completely empty. Though Elizabeth implores the police to investigate, they tell her that there is nothing that they can do. Meanwhile, Jenni is lured to Elizabeth's house by the hacker, who pretends to be Elizabeth. The hacker abducts Jenni when she arrives.

While harried from trying to find a way to reach Damien, Elizabeth receives an angry call from Sally. Sally informs Elizabeth that the video of her and Damien having sex was sent to the entire graduate board. Sally does not believe Elizabeth, when the latter insists that she was hacked. Sally informs her that her grant is suspended until further notice. Later, while trying to reach Jenni, Elizabeth is lured to Jenni's house, where she finds the power cut. Seeing water flooding from the bathroom, Elizabeth enters to find Jenni in the bathtub, her wrists slashed in an apparent suicide attempt. Though Jenni is alive when Elizabeth finds her, she dies soon after. Elizabeth finds a suicide note emailed to her, ostensibly from the hacker posing as Jenni.

Elizabeth is further shaken when she receives a message showing the attackers stalking and entering a home owned by Lynn, Elizabeth's pregnant sister. Though Elizabeth notifies the police and calls Lynn to warn her, the message is garbled. The attackers bind Lynn and prepare to cut open her stomach. But then abruptly leave, hiding the camera as they do so. Later, when the house is surrounded by police, one of the attackers returns and picks up the camera. This reveals that they are either part of law enforcement or posing as a police officer. The attacker fixates on the father of Lynn's child, who she is separated from. The attacker leaves and gets into a car. He follows Elizabeth back to her home, where she is packing in preparation to keep her sister company. She receives a chat request from Max, which shows the lead detective entering Max's house, and being murdered on-screen while there. Elizabeth calls for help from the officer guarding her, but she finds him murdered as well. She is attacked by a hooded figure hidden in her closet, but she stabs him repeatedly and flees. She is then apprehended by another hooded attacker, who was waiting outside.

Elizabeth awakens in a room of a nightmarish, abandoned complex. She is chained to a wall, with a GoPro stapled to her forehead. A computer is in the room, forcing her to chat with the abducted Damien. He informs her that there are many other attackers. She is also shown a recorded video of Max being strangled with plastic wrap by the killers. Damien is then beaten and taken away to presumably be killed off-screen. Afterwards, another hooded man enters the room with Elizabeth, preparing to kill her. She overpowers him and strangles him with her chain. Unlocking her shackles with his keys, she attempts to escape the dark complex. She is only armed with a discarded hammer. She is chased by a number of killers, one of whom is a young man. She attacks this man, demanding to know where Damien is; he tells her that he is not there. She manages to escape to above ground, bludgeoning other attackers. She hijacks one of their cars, but crashes when blindsided by another member's car. She is removed from the wreck by the killers, and dragged back to the complex.

The film cuts to another woman, Brianne, on The Den who chatted with Elizabeth at the start of the project. Much like Elizabeth's first interaction with the killers, she is lured to chat when one of the attackers pretends Elizabeth's webcam is broken. Brianne then views a recording of Elizabeth being hanged almost to death and then shot in the head by the killers. It is then revealed that the video of Elizabeth's death is also being viewed by a man surfing a website. The website features snuff film "narratives" of victims lured by killers exploiting The Den. The man is preparing to pay for Brianne's "narrative", before being interrupted by her son.

Cast
 Melanie Papalia as Elizabeth "Liz" Benton
 David Schlachtenhaufen as Damien
 Adam Shapiro as Max
 Anna Margaret Hollyman as Lynn Benton
 Matt Riedy as Sgt. Tisbert
 Katija Pevec as Jenni
 Saidah Arrika Ekulona as Sally
 Anthony Jennings as Officer Dawson
 Victoria Hanlin as Brianne

Reception
On Rotten Tomatoes, The Den has a rating of 76% from 21 critics with an average of 6.28/10. Metacritic gives the film a weighted average of 48/100 based on 6 critics, indicating "mixed or average reviews". Fearnet gave The Den a positive review, commenting that it "starts out a little rocky but if you're not completely fed up with 'found footage' filmmaking by now and you're willing to give a non-traditional visual presentation a fair shot, The Den has some pretty compelling things to say about the alleged safety of the internet." We Got This Covered also praised the movie, stating that it "[executed] on a strong gimmick at a speedy, flowing pace." In contrast, Shock Till You Drop panned the movie as it felt that it "lacks true scares, awesome kills or even the routine flash of nudity to warrant any sort of viewing. It panders a silly and over exaggerated message of the dangers of the anonymity of the internet and the “nature” of people. It uses a silly plot to carry a ridiculous camera technique and delivers nothing but angst and irritation." Fangoria criticized the film for many of the same reasons, as it felt that the movie began on a strong note but became "inauthentic and irritating" after the film depicted "Almost everyone, online or not, responds to [the main character's troubles] with immediate hostility or disbelief."

See also
Unfriended
List of films featuring surveillance
Unfriended: Dark Web

References

External links
 
 

2013 films
2013 horror films
2010s slasher films
Films about computer hacking
Films about kidnapping
Films about snuff films
Films about social media
Films set in abandoned buildings and structures
Found footage films
2013 directorial debut films
IFC Films films
Techno-horror films
Screenlife films
2010s English-language films